The fourth season of the American crime thriller television series The Blacklist premiered on NBC on September 22, 2016. The season was produced by Davis Entertainment, Universal Television and Sony Pictures Television, and the executive producers are Jon Bokenkamp, John Davis, John Eisendrath, John Fox, and Joe Carnahan. The season contained 22 episodes and concluded on May 18, 2017.

Overview 
The fourth season resolves the question of Alexander Kirk's (Ulrich Thomsen) relationship to Elizabeth Keen (Megan Boone). Kirk discovers that Liz is not his daughter and abandons his obsession with winning her trust and loyalty. Reddington (James Spader) attempts to kill Mr. Kaplan (Susan Blommaert) for her efforts in hiding Liz and her baby from him, but Mr. Kaplan survives the attack and begins exposing the trail of dead bodies left by Reddington’s criminal activities. Mr. Kaplan attempts to dismantle Reddington’s organization. FBI Agent Julian Gale (Enrique Murciano), the former partner of Donald Ressler (Diego Klattenhoff) on the Reddington Task Force, is assigned to the Reddington investigation and Gale tries to use Mr. Kaplan's knowledge to bring down Reddington. The final episodes reveal the existence of a suitcase containing human bones of unknown origins that figure prominently in the next season.

Cast

Main cast
 James Spader as Raymond "Red" Reddington
 Megan Boone as Elizabeth Keen
 Diego Klattenhoff as Donald Ressler 
 Ryan Eggold as Tom Keen
 Harry Lennix as Harold Cooper
 Amir Arison as Aram Mojtabai
 Mozhan Marnò as Samar Navabi
 Hisham Tawfiq as Dembe Zuma

Recurring 
 Susan Blommaert as Kathryn Nemec/Mr. Kaplan, Reddington’s cleaner.
 Ulrich Thomsen as Alexander Kirk/Konstantin Rostov, the man who claims to be Liz's father.
 Deirdre Lovejoy as Cynthia Panabaker
 Christine Lahti as National Security Advisor Laurel Hitchen
 Enrique Murciano as FBI investigator Julian Gale
 Clark Middleton as DMV employee Glen Carter
 Fisher Stevens as Marvin Gerard, Reddington’s personal attorney.
 Leon Rippy as the Hunter, a loner who saves Mr. Kaplan.
 Lotte Verbeek as Katarina Rostova, a spy and the mother of Agent Keen.
 Matt Servitto as Sebastian Reifler, a doctor treating Alexander Kirk.
 Raoul Trujillo as Mato, a hitman employed by Alexander Kirk.
 Annie Heise as Elise/Janet Sutherland, an operative/hacker dating Aram.

Episodes

Reception 
The fourth season of The Blacklist received positive reviews from critics. The review aggregator website Rotten Tomatoes reports an 88% approval rating based on eight reviews, with an average score of 7/10.

Ratings

References

External links
 
 

2016 American television seasons
2017 American television seasons
4